Millgrove is a small rural community in Ontario, Canada.

History

It is located within the former township of West Flamborough of the Flamborough region and is a part of the amalgamated city of Hamilton. There is Millgrove Public School, a park, cemetery, a riding barn in the name of Foxcroft, a corner store and many other things.

Climate

Notable people
Danny Syvret – National Hockey League player

In media
Gulliver's Lake RV Resort & Campground has been used to film episodes of the Cream Productions Paranormal TV Show Evil Encounters. One such episode entitled "Terror From the Sky" features the famous Travis Walton UFO incident.

References

External links

The Cedars LGBT Campground – Millgrove, Ontario

Neighbourhoods in Hamilton, Ontario